SSDT may refer to:

Computing 
 System Service Descriptor Table, an internal data structure within Microsoft Windows
 Secondary System Description Table, an ACPI table
 SQL Server Data Tools, the IDE for working with Microsoft SQL Server 2012 databases and associated objects

Other uses 
 Scottish Six Days Trial, a motorcycle competition
 Scottish Solicitors' Discipline Tribunal
 Sekiro: Shadows Die Twice